"Conspiracy of Silence" is the twenty-third episode of the second series of the 1960s cult British spy-fi television series The Avengers, starring Patrick Macnee and Honor Blackman. It was first broadcast in the Teledu Cymru region of the ITV network on Friday 1 March 1963. ABC Weekend TV, who produced the show for ITV, broadcast it the next day in its own regions. The episode was directed by Peter Hammond and written by Roger Marshall.

Plot
Steed and Cathy investigate a Mafia drugs gang using a travelling circus as a front. Clowning around leads a nosy journalist to use her judo.

Cast
 Patrick Macnee as John Steed
 Honor Blackman as Cathy Gale
 Robert Rietti as Carlo Bennett
 Sandra Dorne as Rickie Bennett
 Alec Mango as Sica
 Roy Purcell as Gutman
 Tommy Godfrey as Arturo
 John Church as Terry
 Artro Morris as James
 Willie Shearer as Professor
 Ian Wilson as Rant

References

External links

Episode overview on The Avengers Forever! website

The Avengers (season 2) episodes
1963 British television episodes